The nth degree may refer to:
 The degree of a polynomial, where n represents a natural number 
 "The Nth Degree" (Star Trek: The Next Generation)
 "Nth Degree" (song), a song by New York City band Morningwood
 A mathematically specious phrase intended to convey that something is raised to a very high level (as in "to the Nth degree"), where "n" is assumed to be a relatively high number even though by definition it is unspecified and may be large or small
 An English saying referring to an unspecified term of a sequence

Meaning
Nth degree, or nth degree, are two words expressing a number to a certain level. In the first word, 'Nth' or 'nth', is a word expressing a number, in two parts, 'n' and 'th', but where that number is not known, (hence the use of 'n') and a correlatory factoring, 'th', (exponential amplification, usually from four onwards (fourth, fifth)), is used to multiply the 'n' (number), to arrive at a number, concomitant to subject matter. The 'degree' is used as a noun, expressing the level or amount of the final multiplicated number.

See also 
 Nth (disambiguation)